Audifia laevithorax is a species of cobweb spider in the family Theridiidae. It is found in Brazil.

References

Theridiidae
Spiders described in 1884
Spiders of Brazil